Cyrtocarenum is a genus of Balkan trapdoor spiders first described by Anton Ausserer in 1871.  it contains only two species found in Greece and Turkey: C. cunicularium and C. grajum.

References

Ctenizidae
Mygalomorphae genera
Taxa named by Anton Ausserer